Three ships of the Royal Navy have borne the name Mackerel, after the Mackerel, a name given to a number of species of fish:

  was a dogger captured in 1646 and last recorded in 1647.
 was a 4-gun  launched in 1804 and sold in 1815.
 was an  wooden screw gunboat launched in 1856 and broken up in 1862.

Royal Navy ship names